Dnevnik is a daily newspaper published in Ljubljana, Slovenia.

History and profile
Dnevnik was first issued in June 1951 as Ljubljanski dnevnik but was renamed to Dnevnik in 1968. The paper is based in Ljubljana.

The circulation of Dnevnik was 66,000 copies in 2003. Its 2007 circulation was 58,300 copies, making it the third most read daily in the country. During the period of July–September 2011 it had a circulation of 37,194 copies. According to a periodic poll on printed media, conducted by marketing research company Valicon, Dnevnik had a reach of  147,000 from second half of 2011 and first half of 2012.

References

External links
 Online edition of Dnevnik

1951 establishments in Yugoslavia
Publications established in 1951
Newspapers published in Slovenia
Newspapers published in Yugoslavia
Slovene-language newspapers
Mass media in Ljubljana